The 2016 Austrian Darts Open was the fifth of ten PDC European Tour events on the 2016 PDC Pro Tour. The tournament took place at Multiversum Schwechat in Vienna, Austria, between 10–12 June 2016. It featured a field of 48 players and £115,000 in prize money, with £25,000 going to the winner.

Vincent van der Voort was the defending champion from the 2014 tournament, but lost in the first round to Steve Beaton.

Phil Taylor won the event after beating Michael Smith 6–4 in the final, in what was his first (and what would turn out to be his last) PDC European Tour event since the 2014 Gibraltar Darts Trophy.

Prize money
The prize money of the European Tour events stays the same as last year.

Qualification and format
The top 16 players from the PDC ProTour Order of Merit on 13 May automatically qualified for the event and were seeded in the second round. The remaining 32 places went to players from three qualifying events - 20 from the UK Qualifier (held in Coventry on 20 May), eight from the European Qualifier on 1 June and four from the Host Nation Qualifier on 9 June.

The following players will take part in the tournament:

Top 16
  Michael van Gerwen (quarter-finals)
  Peter Wright (quarter-finals)
  Michael Smith (runner-up)
  Dave Chisnall (third round)
  Kim Huybrechts (third round)
  Ian White (third round)
  Benito van de Pas (third round)
  Jelle Klaasen (third round)
  Mensur Suljović (second round)
  Terry Jenkins (semi-finals)
  Robert Thornton (second round)
  Phil Taylor (winner)
  Stephen Bunting (quarter-finals)
  Simon Whitlock (second round)
  Alan Norris (third round)
  Gerwyn Price (second round)

UK Qualifier
  Steve West (second round)
  Mervyn King (first round)
  Justin Pipe (first round)
  Brendan Dolan (first round)
  Chris Dobey (second round)
  Wayne Jones (first round)
  Josh Payne (second round)
  Steve Beaton (third round)
  James Richardson (second round)
  Jonny Clayton (second round)
  Kyle Anderson (semi-finals)
  Jamie Caven (second round)
  Nigel Heydon (quarter-finals)
  Steve McNally (first round)
  Darron Brown (first round)
  Mark Frost (second round)
  Wes Newton (first round)
  Simon Stevenson (second round)
  James Wilson (first round)
  Ross Smith (first round)
 
European Qualifier
  Ron Meulenkamp (third round)
  Jermaine Wattimena (second round)
  Jeffrey de Graaf (first round)
  Vincent van der Voort (first round)
  Mike Zuydwijk (first round)
  Dimitri Van den Bergh (second round)
  Christian Kist (first round)
  Jeffrey de Zwaan (first round)

Host Nation Qualifier
  Nico Mandl (first round)
  Zoran Lerchbacher (second round)
  Rowby-John Rodriguez (second round)
  Roxy-James Rodriguez (first round)

Draw

References

2016 PDC European Tour
2016 in Austrian sport